Eef van Riel (born 24 December 1991) is a Dutch footballer who plays for IJsselmeervogels in the Dutch Tweede Divisie.

Club career
He made his professional debut in the Eerste Divisie for Achilles '29 on 7 August 2015 in a game against Jong Ajax.

References

External links
 
 

1991 births
People from Lingewaard
Living people
Dutch footballers
De Treffers players
Achilles '29 players
IJsselmeervogels players
Eerste Divisie players
Tweede Divisie players
Association football midfielders
Footballers from Gelderland